The metropolitan area of León is the seventh most populated metropolitan area in Mexico, with nearly 1,609,717 inhabitants. It includes the core city of León, Guanajuato, with a population of 1,436,733. The metropolitan area also counts with the municipality of Silao, all situated in the state of Guanajuato, Mexico.

References

León, Guanajuato
Populated places in Guanajuato
Metropolitan areas of Mexico